Mayflower Manor Apartments is a high-rise residential building located at 263 South Main Street in Downtown Akron, Ohio, United States. It has 16 floors (as well as one sub-level) and stands at a height of 207 feet, making it one of the tallest buildings in the city.

History
Construction of the Mayflower Hotel began in 1930 and it was completed in 1931. It was designed by the prolific architecture firm Graham, Anderson, Probst & White, and has many trademark features of the Art Deco style of its day. Sheraton Hotels purchased the Mayflower in 1955 and renamed it first the Sheraton-Mayflower and then later the Sheraton Hotel. Sheraton sold the hotel, along with seventeen other aging properties, to Gotham Hotels in 1968 and it regained its original name.

References

Buildings and structures in Akron, Ohio
Residential buildings completed in 1931
Skyscrapers in Akron, Ohio
Residential skyscrapers in Ohio
Hotel buildings completed in 1931
Sheraton hotels
1931 establishments in Ohio